Marcin Trębacki (born September 12, 1981 in Łódź, Poland) is a Polish ice dancer. He previously competed with Paulina Urban, Dominika Polakowska, and Dominika Haaza. He is married to ice dancer Sylwia Nowak, with whom he has a son, Maksymilian, and a daughter, Sonia.

Competitive highlights
(with Polakowska)

 J = Junior level

External links
 

1981 births
Polish male ice dancers
Living people
Sportspeople from Łódź